The Swedish Speedway Team Championship is the team championship of speedway in Sweden.

Season by season tables

History
The Championship was introduced in 1950. 

In 1982 the Championship was renamed with a new league called the Elitserien being introduced. The second tier of the Championship is known as the Allsvenskan.

Between 1986 and 1999 the team that finished top of the league were declared champions because there was no play off.

List of Winners

See also
 Elitserien (current highest tier)
 Allsvenskan (current second tier)

References

Team